The Martyrdom of Saint Catherine may refer to one of a number of paintings:
 The Martyrdom of Saint Catherine (Guercino)
 The Martyrdom of Saint Catherine (Reni)